Tidemand is a surname. Notable people with the surname include:

Adolph Tidemand (1814–1876), Norwegian painter
Ole Tidemand (1710–1778), Norwegian theologian and priest
Otto Grieg Tidemand (1921–2006), Norwegian politician
Pontus Tidemand (born 1990), Swedish rally and rallycross driver